The following is a list of players and who appeared in at least one game for the Baltimore Orioles franchise of Major League Baseball, which played in the American Association from  until  and in the National League from  until . Players in bold are in the Baseball Hall of Fame.



A
John Ake
Doug Allison
Doc Amole

B
Jersey Bakely
George Baker
Kirtley Baker
Norm Baker
Phil Baker
Art Ball
Billy Barnie
George Blackburn
Ned Bligh
Frank Bonner
Amos Booth
Frank Bowerman
George Bradley
Steve Brodie
Cal Broughton
Dan Brouthers
Joe Brown
Stub Brown
Tom Brown
William Brown
Charlie Buffinton
Oyster Burns
Pat Burns
Frank Burt

C
Bart Cantz
Scoops Carey
Dennis Casey
Boileryard Clarke
Dad Clarkson
Monk Cline
Jim Clinton
George Cobb
Dick Cogan
Bill Conway
Dick Conway
Joe Corbett
Pat Crisham
Monte Cross
Bert Cunningham

D
Sun Daley
Law Daniels
Jumbo Davis
Gene DeMontreville
Gene Derby
Frank Diven
Buttercup Dickerson
Tom Dolan
Jim Donnelly
Joe Dowie
Jack Doyle

E
Harry East
Dave Eggler
Harry Ely
Bob Emslie
Duke Esper
Jake Evans
Tom Evers

F
Bill Farrell
Jack Farrell
Joe Farrell
Alex Ferson
Jim Field
Frank Foreman
John Fox
Chris Fulmer
Dave Fultz

G
Bill Gallagher
Bill Gardner
Gid Gardner
Bill Geiss
Les German
Jake Gettman
Bill Gilbert
Pete Gilbert
Bob Gilks
Kid Gleason
John Godar
George Goetz
Walt Goldsby
Fred Goldsmith
Bill Greenwood
Ed Greer
Mike Griffin
Joe Gunson

H
Jocko Halligan
Ned Hanlon
Lou Hardie
John Harkins
Charlie Harris
Bill Hawke
Jackie Hayes
John Healy
Tony Hellman
George Hemming
Hardie Henderson
John Henry
Tom Hess
Mike Heydon
Belden Hill
Bill Hill
Bill Hoffer
Will Holland
Ducky Holmes
Buster Hoover
Jack Horner
Joe Hornung
Sadie Houck
Charlie Householder
Frank Houseman
Harry Howell
Jay Hughes

I
Charlie Ingraham
Bert Inks

J
Harry Jacoby
Hughie Jennings
Bill Johnson
Bill Jones

K
Bob Keating
Willie Keeler
Bill Keister
Joe Kelley
John Kelly
John Kerins
Matt Kilroy
Mike Kilroy
Bill Kissinger
Frank Kitson
Bill Kling
Ed Knouff

L
Candy LaChance
Doc Landis
Jack Leary
Charlie Levis
Dan Long
Jim Long

M
Reddy Mack
Jimmy Macullar
Kid Madden
George Magoon
Jack Manning
Tim Manning
George Mappes
Al Maul
Jerry McCormick
Sandy McDermott
Dan McGann
Chippy McGarr
Jumbo McGinnis
Joe McGinnity
John McGraw
Joe McGuckin
Doc McJames
Kit McKenna
Jim McLaughlin
Sadie McMahon
Edgar McNabb
Dusty Miller
Ralph Miller
Jocko Milligan
Mike Morrison
Bill Mountjoy
Mike Muldoon
Tony Mullane
Henry Myers

N
Sandy Nava
Jack Neagle
Tricky Nichols
Jerry Nops

O
Jack O'Brien
John O'Brien
Tom O'Brien (2B)
Tom O'Brien (OF)
John O'Connell
Pat O'Connell
Dave Oldfield
Patrick O'Loughlin
Mike O'Rourke

P
John Peltz
John Pickett
Gracie Pierce
Arlie Pond
Abner Powell
Tom Power
Phil Powers
Blondie Purcell

Q
Joe Quinn
Tom Quinn

R
Irv Ray
Billy Reid
Heinie Reitz
Wilbert Robinson
Bobby Rothermel
Dave Rowe
Jim Roxburgh
John Russ
Jack Ryan

S
Lou Say
Nick Scharf
Crazy Schmit
Milt Scott
Sam Shaw
Jimmy Sheckard
John Shetzline
Billy Shindle
George Shoch
Lev Shreve
Bill Smiley
Aleck Smith
Lewis Smith
Phenomenal Smith
Joe Sommer
Len Sowders
Dan Stearns
Jake Stenzel
Ben Stephens
Otis Stocksdale
Harry Stovey
Cub Stricker 
Sy Sutcliffe
Rooney Sweeney

T
Pop Tate
Billy Taylor
Harry Taylor
John Tener
Adonis Terry
George Townsend
Bill Traffley
George Treadway
Sam Trott
Tommy Tucker

V
George Van Haltren
Tom Vickery
Joe Visner

W
Jack Wadsworth
Charlie Waitt
George Walker
Oscar Walker
Joe Walsh
Piggy Ward
Curt Welch
Perry Werden
George Wetzel
Lew Whistler
Pat Whitaker
Ed Whiting
Henry Wilson
Bill Wise
Sam Wise
George Wood

Y
Tom York

Z
William Zay

External links
Baseball Reference

Major League Baseball all-time rosters